, son of Sukezane and adopted son of his brother Morotaka, was a kugyō or Japanese court noble of the Edo period (1603–1868). He married a daughter of Tokugawa Yoshimichi (fourth head of Owari Domain) and adopted daughter of Tokugawa Tsugutomo (sixth head of Owari Domain) known as Shinjuin (1706-1757). The couple had two sons: Kujō Tanemoto and Nijō Munemoto.

Family
Father: Kujō Sukezane
Mother: concubine
Foster mother: Imperial Princess Mashiko (1669-1738)
Wife: Senhime (1706-1757)
Children (all by Senhime):
 Kujō Tanemoto 
 Nijō Munemoto

References
 

1700 births
1728 deaths
Fujiwara clan
Kujō family